Emamzadeh Harun (also Romanized as Emāmzādeh Hārūn) is a village in Rudbar-e Shahrestan Rural District, Alamut-e Gharbi District, Qazvin County, Qazvin Province, Iran. At the 2006 census, its population was 30, in 9 families.

References 

Populated places in Qazvin County